Bernhard Engelbert Joseph Danckelmann (5 April 1831, at the Forsthaus Obereimer near Arnsberg – 19 January 1901, in Eberswalde) was a German forester and forest  scientist.

Life 
He studied forestry at the Eberswalde Forest Academy (Forstakademie) in 1850–52, and later studied law at the University of Berlin (1855–56). From 1862 he worked as an Oberförster in Hambach, and two years later became a forest inspector in Potsdam. In 1866 he was appointed director of the Forest Academy in Eberswalde.

From 1869 he was editor of the Zeitschrift für Forst und Jagdwesen ("Journal of Forestry and Gamekeeping").

Selected writings 
 Die Forstakademie Eberwalde von 1830 bis 1880, in: Festschrift für die Fünfzigjährige Jubelfeier der Forstakademie Eberswalde, 1880, pp. [1]-62 – The forest academy in Eberswalde from 1830 to 1880, in: Festschrift for fifty years of jubilant celebration of the forestry academy in Eberswalde.
 Die Ablösung und Regelung der Waldgrundgerechtigkeiten, 1880.
 Die deutschen Nutzholzzölle; eine Waldschutzschrift, 1883 – German timber tariffs, a paper on forest protection.

See also 
 Forstbotanischer Garten Eberswalde

References 
 Albrecht Milnik: Bernhard Danckelmann. Leben und Leistungen eines Forstmannes. Nimrod, Suderburg 1999, 352 S.,   
 Albrecht Milnik: Bernhard Danckelmann, in  derselbe (Hrsg.) et al.: Im Dienst am Wald – Lebenswege und Leistungen brandenburgischer Forstleute. Brandenburgische Lebensbilder. Verlag Kessel, Remagen-Oberwinter 2006, S. 231–233.

External links 

 

Eintrag in Meyers Konversationslexikon 1905ff.
Materialien zur Entstehungsgeschichte des BGB
Biographie Staatsbibliothek Berlin 

1831 births
1901 deaths
German foresters
Forestry academics
Academic staff of the Eberswalde University for Sustainable Development